Gotcha Covered is the eighth studio album by Australian rock back The Screaming Jets. The album features The Screaming Jets covering 15 iconic Australian songs spanning the mid 1960s to late 1990s. The album will be supported by a national tour. Upon release, singer and lead singer Dave Gleeson said “What we came up with was a great Aussie party album. Covering songs that have shaped us; songs from our youth; songs that have been written and performed by contemporaries and songs that will make even the most loyal fan go “what the”.”

The band showcased the entire album on the 3rd and 4th of August 2018 at The Bridge Hotel, Sydney.

Reception
Nick Barrett from Overdrive Magazine said "Gotcha Covered is an incredibly satisfying, well-constructed and sensationally enjoyable covers album. Each and every track has a reason for being on the album and The Screaming Jets have somewhat mystifyingly kept most of the content sounding fresh and unique. The song selection is eclectic enough that it will appeal to a variety of audiences, while also introducing listeners to songs they may not have heard before. The phenomenal performances, track-listing and production quality on Gotcha Covered make the album one worth listening to on repeat."
Jeff Jenkins from Stack Magazine called the album "a love letter to Oz rock."

Track listing

Charts

Release history

References

2018 albums
Covers albums
The Screaming Jets albums